James Wesley Hook (born November 18, 1936) is an American former starting pitcher in Major League Baseball. From 1957 through 1964, Hook played for the Cincinnati Reds (1957–61) and New York Mets (1962–64). He batted left-handed and threw right-handed.

In an eight-season career, Hook posted a 29–62 record with 394 strikeouts and a 5.23 ERA in 752.2 innings pitched.

Jay attended high school at Grayslake Community High School (now Grayslake Central High School).

A bonus baby signed by the Cincinnati Reds out of Northwestern University, Hook made his major league debut with Cincinnati in 1957. He joined the Reds regular pitching rotation in 1960 and had an 11–18 mark, including a two-hit shutout against the Milwaukee Braves.

Before the 1962 season, Hook was acquired by the New York Mets in the 1961 MLB Expansion Draft, along with Hobie Landrith, Elio Chacón, Roger Craig, Gil Hodges, Don Zimmer and Gus Bell, among others. 
    	
On April 23, 1962, Hook became the first winning pitcher in Mets franchise history, tossing a complete-game, 5-hitter in New York's 9–1 win versus Pittsburgh at Forbes Field, giving the team its first regular-season victory after nine defeats. In that season he compiled an 8–19 mark for the Mets, and led the team in complete games (13) and games started (34).

Those 1962 Mets had a record of 40–120, still the most losses for any Major League team in a single season since the 19th Century.

After receiving a master's degree in thermodynamics, Hook retired in 1964 at age 28 to take a job with Chrysler Corporation.

Jay Hook and his wife Joan now reside in Maple City, Michigan.

References

External links

Cincinnati Reds players
New York Mets players
Nashville Vols players
Seattle Rainiers players
Denver Bears players
Northwestern Wildcats baseball players
Northwestern Wildcats men's basketball players
Major League Baseball pitchers
Sportspeople from Waukegan, Illinois
Baseball players from Illinois
1936 births
Living people
People from Leelanau County, Michigan